Nick Mourouzis (April 16, 1937 – September 16, 2020) was an American football player and coach. He served as the head football coach at DePauw University in Greencastle, Indiana, from 1981 to 2003, compiling a record of 138–87–4. As a college football player, Mourouzis was a starting quarterback at Miami University in Oxford, Ohio.

Biography
Nick Mourouzis was born on April 16, 1937, in Tuscarawas County, Ohio. He played football and baseball in high school, and was discovered by Ara Parseghian who recruited him to play for Miami University. He graduated from Miami in 1959, and received his master's degree in 1961. In 1971, he received another master's degree from Indiana University.

Mourouzis served as the head football coach at DePauw University in Greencastle, Indiana, from 1981 to 2003, compiling a record of 133–82–4. In 1996, Mourouzis founded Chi Alpha Sigma Honor Society for Student-Athletes.

Mourouzis died from complications of COVID-19  in Greencastle, Indiana, on September 16, 2020, at the age of 83, during the COVID-19 pandemic in Indiana.

Head coaching record

References

1937 births
2020 deaths
American people of Greek descent
American football quarterbacks
Ball State Cardinals football coaches
DePauw Tigers football coaches
Indiana Hoosiers football coaches
Miami RedHawks football players
Northwestern Wildcats football coaches
Ohio Bobcats football coaches
Indiana University alumni
People from Tuscarawas County, Ohio
Coaches of American football from Ohio
Players of American football from Ohio
Deaths from the COVID-19 pandemic in Indiana